Cyana rubristriga is a moth of the family Erebidae. It was described by William Jacob Holland in 1893. It is found in the Central African Republic, the Democratic Republic of the Congo and Gabon.

Subspecies
Cyana rubristriga rubristriga
Cyana rubristriga katanga Karisch & Dall'Asta, 2010 (Democratic Republic of the Congo)

References

Cyana
Moths described in 1893
Insects of the Democratic Republic of the Congo
Fauna of the Republic of the Congo
Fauna of Gabon
Moths of Africa